Zgornja Brežnica is a settlement in the Municipality of Slovenska Bistrica in northeastern Slovenia. It lies on the main regional road from Slovenska Bistrica to Poljčane. The area is part of the traditional region of Styria. It is now included with the rest of the municipality in the Drava Statistical Region.

References

External links
Zgornja Brežnica at Geopedia

Populated places in the Municipality of Slovenska Bistrica